Brendan Toal (born 1 December 1940) is an Irish former politician, who was a Fine Gael Teachta Dála (TD) for the Monaghan constituency from 1973 to 1977.

From Smithborough, County Monaghan, and a lawyer by profession, Toal was elected to the 21st Dáil at a by-election in November 1973, to fill a vacancy caused by the election as President of Monaghan Fianna Fáil TD Erskine H. Childers. In 1977 he was chairman of Monaghan County Council. The Monaghan constituency was abolished in boundary changes for the 1977 general election, and Toal was defeated in the new Cavan–Monaghan constituency. Before the new Dáil met, outgoing Taoiseach Liam Cosgrave appointed Toal to the Land Commission. He did not stand for the Dáil again.

References

1940 births
Living people
Fine Gael TDs
Members of the 20th Dáil
Politicians from County Monaghan
Local councillors in County Monaghan